Stanley Mandebele (born 6 June 1962, died before 2008) was a Zimbabwean long-distance runner. He competed in the men's 5000 metres at the 1988 Summer Olympics.

References

1962 births
Year of death missing
Athletes (track and field) at the 1988 Summer Olympics
Zimbabwean male long-distance runners
Olympic athletes of Zimbabwe
Place of birth missing